The Tracy House also known as the Bill and Elizabeth Tracy House is a Frank Lloyd Wright-designed  Usonian Automatic home that was constructed in Normandy Park, Washington, a suburb near Seattle, in 1956.

The house, like other Wright-designed Usonian automatics, is composed of concrete blocks that is broken up by glass and redwood plywood.

The Tracy House was built for Bill and Elizabeth Tracy, who occupied it until the latter's death in 2012; the property was listed on the real estate market for the first time at a price of $950,000.

In 2011, Seattle Met named it one of the ten greatest homes in the Seattle area.

References

 Storrer, William Allin. The Frank Lloyd Wright Companion. University of Chicago Press (2006), S.389,

External links
Tracy House on waymarking.com
Wright Studies: William B. and Elizabeth Tracy Residence, Normandy Park, WA (1955) (S.389)
Photos on flickr.com
The Wright Idea — This Famed Architect's Design Was Both Art and Labor, The Seattle Times, September 8, 1996
Photos on Arcaid Images

Frank Lloyd Wright buildings
History of King County, Washington
National Register of Historic Places in King County, Washington
Houses on the National Register of Historic Places in Washington (state)
Houses completed in 1956
Modernist architecture in Washington (state)
Houses in King County, Washington